Creasey is a surname. Notable people with the name include:

 Harold Creasey (1883–1952), British sport shooter
 Joel Creasey (born 1990), Australian actor and comedian
 John Creasey (1908–1973), English crime and science fiction writer
 Timothy Creasey (1923–1986), British Army officer

See also 
Creasy (surname) 
Creasey v Breachwood Motors Ltd, UK company law case concerning piercing the corporate veil